Yaroslav Viktorovich Antonov (born 10 January 1963, 198 cm tall) is a Russian former volleyball player who competed for the Soviet Union in the 1988 Summer Olympics. Left handed power hitter.  Usually played opposite the setter.  

In 1988 he was part of the Soviet team which won the silver medal in the Olympic tournament. He played all seven matches.

External links
 profile

1963 births
Living people
Russian men's volleyball players
Soviet men's volleyball players
Olympic volleyball players of the Soviet Union
Volleyball players at the 1988 Summer Olympics
Olympic silver medalists for the Soviet Union
Russian volleyball coaches
Olympic medalists in volleyball
Medalists at the 1988 Summer Olympics
Honoured Masters of Sport of the USSR